Frances Ann Porter (née Fyfe; 2 May 1925 – 3 April 2022) was a New Zealand writer and historian. She edited The Turanga Journals, which contained the letters and journals of William and Jane Williams, and wrote a biography of Maria Atkinson. In 1993, she was awarded an honorary Doctor of Literature degree by Victoria University of Wellington.

References

1925 births
2022 deaths
People from Hāwera
Victoria University of Wellington alumni
20th-century New Zealand historians
New Zealand biographers
New Zealand women historians